Giorgi Bezhanishvili (born November 16, 1998) is an Austrian-Georgian professional basketball player for the College Park Skyhawks of the NBA G League. He played college basketball for the Illinois Fighting Illini.

Early life
Bezhanishvili was born in Rustavi, Georgia on November 16, 1998. In 2002, Bezhanishvili's mother Lali emigrated to Vienna, Austria by way of Prague, Czech Republic in search of work due to economic hardships in Georgia that resulted from the dissolution of the Soviet Union. As a result, when Bezhanishvili was 3 he and his older brother Davit moved in with their grandparents. As a child, Bezhanishvili's hobbies included basketball and dancing. At the age of 10, he placed second in classical dance in a national competition. When he was 14, Bezhanishvili moved to Vienna to be with his mother. In 2016, Bezhanishvili became a naturalized citizen of Austria. Bezhanishvili has learned to speak English, Georgian, German, and Russian.

Youth career
After moving to Vienna, Bezhanishvili played in the youth system for the Basket Flames. From 2014–2016 he played for the men's senior Basket Flames team that competes in the 2. Österreichische Basketball Bundesliga which is the second tier of basketball in Austria. During the 2016–2017 season, Bezhanishvili played for the Klosterneuburg Dukes of the Austrian Basketball League and was teammates with former Lehigh player Michael Ojo. Ojo got Bezhanishvili connected with American basketball coaches which resulted in a scholarship to attend The Patrick School in Elizabeth, New Jersey. With Klosterneuburg, Bezhanishvili averaged 6.2 points, 2.6 rebounds and 1.4 assists.

Recruiting
During his senior year of high school at The Patrick School, Bezhanishvili received a scholarship offer from the University  of Illinois and committed to play college basketball for head coach Brad Underwood after his official visit on March 26, 2018. Bezhanishvili also had considered scholarship offers from Minnesota, Seton Hall, and St. Bonaventure.

College career
As a freshman, Bezhanishvili averaged 12.5 points on 54.2 percent shooting while averaging 5.2 rebounds per game. He set Illinois' freshman scoring record with 35 points against Rutgers. Bezhanishvili went through a slump midway through his sophomore season in which he shot 27 percent over nine games and came off the bench behind Kofi Cockburn. He averaged 6.8 points and 4.8 rebounds per game as a sophomore. As a junior, he averaged 5.1 points and 2.7 rebounds per game. Following the season, Bezhanishvili declared for the 2021 NBA draft.

Professional career
After going undrafted in the 2021 NBA draft, Bezhanishvili joined the Denver Nuggets for NBA Summer League play. On September 13, 2021, he signed an Exhibit 10 deal with the Nuggets. Bezhanishvili joined the Grand Rapids Gold as an affiliate player.

College Park Skyhawks (2022–present)
On August 25, 2022, Bezhanishvili was traded to the College Park Skyhawks.

Career statistics

College

|-
| style="text-align:left;"| 2018–19
| style="text-align:left;"| Illinois
| 33 || 33 || 26.1 || .542 || .167 || .657 || 5.2 || .8 || .7 || .8 || 12.5
|-
| style="text-align:left;"| 2019–20
| style="text-align:left;"| Illinois
| 31 || 24 || 23.2 || .429 || .306 || .596 || 4.8 || 1.6 || .1 || .4 || 6.8
|-
| style="text-align:left;"| 2020–21
| style="text-align:left;"| Illinois
| 31 || 0 || 14.5 || .545 || .500 || .629 || 2.7 || .4 || .2 || .3 || 5.1
|- class="sortbottom"
| style="text-align:center;" colspan="2"| Career
| 95 || 57 || 21.4 || .507 || .264 || .636 || 4.3 || .9 || .3 || .5 || 8.2

References

External links
Illinois Fighting Illini bio

1998 births
Living people
Austrian men's basketball players
Georgian emigrants to the United States
Grand Rapids Gold players
Illinois Fighting Illini men's basketball players
Men's basketball players from Georgia (country)
Power forwards (basketball)
Sportspeople from Vienna
Xion Dukes Klosterneuburg players